Lake Creek Township is one of sixteen townships in Calhoun County, Iowa, United States.  As of the 2000 census, its population was 140.

History
Lake Creek Township was created in 1876. The township took its name from Lake Creek.

Geography 

According to the USGS, it contains one cemetery, Lake Creek.

References

External links 
 City-Data.com

Townships in Calhoun County, Iowa
Townships in Iowa